Eric Donaldson (9 January 1898 – 4 April 1964) was an Australian rules footballer who played with St Kilda in the Victorian Football League (VFL).

His brother Clyde Donaldson played for Essendon.

Notes

External links 

1898 births
Australian rules footballers from Melbourne
St Kilda Football Club players
1964 deaths
People from Caulfield, Victoria